Burayr was a Palestinian Arab village in the Gaza Subdistrict,  northeast of Gaza City. Its population in 1945 was 2,740 and it was depopulated in the 1948 Arab–Israeli War.

Archaeology
In 2013, an archaeological survey was conducted on the site by Hardin W. James, Rachel Hallote, and Benjamin Adam Saidel, on behalf of Mississippi State University. On the basis of Philistine pottery from the 10th or 9th centuries BCE found in excavations of the tell, archaeologist Jeffrey Blakely of University of Wisconsin-Madison believes that Burayr may be the site of a Philistine village contemporary with the nearby Judaean hill forts.

History
It has been suggested that the name Burayr reflects that of a Jewish town, Bror Hayil, mentioned in the Talmud as where rabbi Yohanan ben Zakkai lived in the Ist century CE and officiated over the rabbinic court. The present ruins lie some 400 m northeast of the eponymous kibbutz Bror Hayil.
 
In Byzantine sources it was named  Buriron, and ceramics from the  Byzantine era have been found here.

Middle Ages
The village's current name dates from the Arab conquest of Palestine in the 7th century.

In the ruins of the village was discovered Fatimid inscriptions dating from the 10th centuries.

During Mamluk rule, it was positioned on a main highway leading from Gaza to Bayt Jibrin, branching off the Via Maris at Beit Hanoun. Burayr had its own independent source for water, making it a desired rest place for travelers.

Ottoman period
Burayr was incorporated into the Ottoman Empire in 1517, and in the 1596 tax records, it was under the administration of the Nahiya of Gaza, part of the Sanjak of Gaza. It had a population of 210 household; an estimated population of 1,155.  All the villagers were Muslims. The villagers paid a 40% tax rate on agricultural products, such as wheat, barley, fruits, beehives, and goats; a total of 32,000  akçe. 5/24 parts of the revenues went to a waqf.

In 1838, Edward Robinson found that Burayr was "a flourishing village forming a sort of central point in the plain.. [It had] a large public well, at which camels were drawing water by means of a sakia, or water wheel with jars..." He further noted it as a Muslim village, located in the Gaza district.

In 1863, Burayr was described as a "large and prosperous village of 1,000" and all of its houses were made of mud, except for that of the village sheikh whose home was built of stone, and "round the well, which is broad and deep, ten ancient shafts in greyish white marble are built up in masonry, serving  to make a trough."

An official Ottoman village list from about 1870 showed that Bureir had 167 houses and a population of 579, counting only the men.  In 1883, the SWP described the village as large, with a water wheel to the east, a pool to the north and a garden to the south.

A flourmill was constructed at Bureir sometime around 1904 by a Jewish merchant from Gaza, al-Khudajah Hayyim, which was cooled by water drawn from a well dug nearby.

Burayr was strategically important in World War I and on November 9, 1917, was one of the first places captured by the Allied Forces from the Ottoman Empire, consolidating British hold on positions controlling the approaches to Jaffa and Jerusalem.

British Mandate of Palestine
 
 
During the British Mandate period, Burayr expanded westward, a mosque was built in the center of the village along with a clinic and grain mill. There were two primary schools—one for girls and one for boys—founded in 1920. Water was supplied by three wells inside the village and toward the end of the Mandate, villagers had drilled artesian wells. The local economy boosted in the 1940s when the Iraqi Petroleum Company discovered oil in the vicinity of Burayr and drilled an oil well. The activities of the marketplace were supplemented by a weekly Wednesday market that attracted other villagers and Bedouin. Agriculture and animal husbandry employed most of the residents and the main crops were citrus, grapes, and figs.

In the 1922 census of Palestine, conducted by the British Mandate authorities, Bureir  had a population of 1,591 inhabitants, all Muslims, increasing in the 1931 census  to 1894, still all Muslim, in  414 houses.

In the  1945 statistics  Bureir had a population of 2,740, all Muslims,  with 44,220  dunams of land, according to an official land and population survey.  Of this, 409 dunams were plantations and irrigable land, 43,319 used for cereals, while 130  dunams were built-up land.

1947-48 
On January 29, 1948, Yishuv forces entered the village in five armored vehicles, but were repulsed without casualties. On February 14, an Israeli convoy exchanged fire with the local militia and withdrew. The villagers built a barricade at the entrance of Burayr which was dismantled by British troops the next day.

According to the Palestinian historian Walid Khalidi, Jewish World War II veterans established kibbutz Bror Hayil on a hilltop about a mile from Burayr on April 20, 1948. He says The New York Times reported that "when the Arabs of Burayr awoke, they found the Jews setting up pre-fabricated houses and building a defensive wall and watchtower." The villagers opened fire on them, but the work was completed by noon. Benny Morris says the founding date was May 18, and Israeli sources say the founders were mostly Jewish immigrants from Egypt.

In the course of Operation Barak, which commenced in early May, the Palmach's Negev Brigade and Givati Brigade captured Burayr, which was referred to as "the village of the killers." Dozens of army-age villagers were apparently executed and a teenage girl was apparently raped and killed. The remaining inhabitants fled to Gaza.

Israeli period
Following the war the area was incorporated into the State of Israel. The moshavim of Tlamim and Heletz were established on village land in 1950, with Sde David later established in 1955, and Zohar in 1956, both also on village land. 

In 1992, the Arab village site was described: "Scattered cactuses as well as some lotus and sycamore trees grow on the site. One can see remnants of houses, including an insubstantial portion of a cement wall, among some eucalyptus trees at the entrance of one house. Some village streets are still visible. The lands around the site are cultivated."

See also
 Depopulated Palestinian locations in Israel

References

Bibliography

External links
 Welcome to Burayr, palestineremembered.com
  Burayr,  Zochrot
Survey of Western Palestine, Map 20:   IAA, Wikimedia commons 
 Burayr, from the Khalil Sakakini Cultural Center

District of Gaza
Arab villages depopulated during the 1948 Arab–Israeli War
1948 disestablishments in Mandatory Palestine
Talmud places